Sant'Albano Stura is a comune (municipality) in the Province of Cuneo in the Italian region Piedmont, located about  south of Turin and about  northeast of Cuneo.

Sant'Albano Stura borders the following municipalities: Fossano, Magliano Alpi, Montanera, Morozzo, Rocca de' Baldi, and Trinità.

References

Cities and towns in Piedmont